The Prescott Drawbridge, also called the Point Douglas Drawbridge, is a steel girder bridge with a double-leaf bascule drawbridge section. The roadbed of the drawbridge span is a steel grate. The bridge carries U.S. 10 across the St. Croix River and connects Prescott, Wisconsin, with the Point Douglas park area of Denmark Township, Minnesota. This is the only highway drawbridge in the Minneapolis–Saint Paul area with active traffic. It was completed in 1990 and replaced a rare regional example of a Waddell & Harrington vertical-lift bridge completed in 1922 that operated as a toll bridge from 1923 to 1946. The environmental impact statement, published in 1979, considered a higher level fixed bridge at this location.

Adjacent to the road bridge, the BNSF Railway St. Croix Subdivision crosses the St. Croix river on a Vertical-lift bridge.

Gallery

See also
List of bridges documented by the Historic American Engineering Record in Minnesota
List of bridges documented by the Historic American Engineering Record in Wisconsin

References

External links

Current bridge
Point Douglas Draw Bridge at MSP Bridges

Previous bridge

Road bridges in Minnesota
Vertical lift bridges in the United States
Vertical lift bridges in Minnesota
Bascule bridges in the United States
U.S. Route 10
Road bridges in Wisconsin
Bridges completed in 1922
Bridges completed in 1990
Bridges of the United States Numbered Highway System
Great River Road
Historic American Engineering Record in Minnesota
Historic American Engineering Record in Wisconsin
Interstate vehicle bridges in the United States
Former toll bridges in Minnesota
Former toll bridges in Wisconsin
Towers in Wisconsin
Steel bridges in the United States
Girder bridges in the United States
Bridges over the St. Croix River (Wisconsin–Minnesota)